The 2015–16 Serie A2 season, known for sponsorship reasons as the Serie A2 Citroën, was the 42nd season of the Italian basketball second league Serie A2 Basket. The season started on October 4, 2015 and ended on June 23, 2016 with the last game of the promotion playoffs finals.

Rules

The season is composed of 32 teams with a regional subdivision in two equal groups of sixteen, East and West. Each team plays the others in its subgroup twice, the first ranked team of each group then plays the eighth ranked team of the other group (e.g. East #1 against West #8), then the second best against the seventh, and so on, to form a promotion playoffs (for one place) of sixteen teams.

Teams

Groups

Number of teams by region

Venues and locations

Regular season

East Group

League table

Results

West Group

League table

Results

Coppa Italia

At the half of the league, the four first teams of each group in the table play the  Final Eight of the LNP Cup at a neutral venue the Federation propose.
The LNP Cup Final Eight was played from March 4 to 6, 2016.

Bracket

Playout
As of 20 May 2016

Playoffs
As of 24 June 2016

Statistical leaders

Points

Assists

Steals

Rebounds

Blocks

Valuation

Sponsors

References

External links
Official website 

Serie A2 Basket seasons
2015–16 in Italian basketball
Italy